Charles Bertie Helps (1910–1991) was an English male track cyclist.

Cycling career
Helps became British champion when winning the British National Individual Sprint Championships in 1936. He turned professional in 1939.

References

1910 births
1991 deaths
British male cyclists
British track cyclists